The Ultimate Collection is a greatest hits album by American folk singer Paul Simon. It is the first album to include a selection of Simon & Garfunkel's best-known songs as well as the biggest hits of Simon's own solo career. The album debuted at number one the UK Albums Chart and the Scottish Albums Chart, giving Simon his first UK chart topper since 1990.

Critical reception

Timothy Monger gave the album a 4/5 review and said: "Though billed as a Paul Simon anthology, Sony's 19-song Ultimate Collection features nearly as much Simon & Garfunkel material as it does his solo work. Ranging from the duo's early-'60s breakthrough folk hit "The Sound of Silence" to Simon's 1990 percussive, Latin-flavored single "The Obvious Child," this set is focused largely on the more titanic tracks of his career. Displaying his range equally as a singer ("Still Crazy After All These Years") and a songwriter (the Art Garfunkel-led masterpiece "Bridge Over Troubled Water"), it's difficult to choose highlights, as almost all of these songs are career highlights and many are widely recognized as iconic classics of pop music. While it would be nice to see some representation of Simon's excellent solo releases of the late '90s and early 21st century, it's tough to argue with the selections offered here."

Chart performance
The Ultimate Collection debuted at number one on the UK Albums Chart on April 19, 2015 after selling 15,487 copies in its first week, marking Simon's sixth UK chart-topper and his first for 25 years. It also made Simon, at 73 years, six months and seven days old, the second oldest male soloist ever to have a number one album, trailing only Bob Dylan who was two months and nine days older when his album, Shadows in the Night, topped the chart two months earlier. However, the album's sales were the lowest for a UK number-one album since Rihanna's album Talk That Talk returned to number one in August 2012 on sales of 9,578.

Track listing

Charts and certifications

Weekly charts

Year-end charts

Certifications

References

2015 compilation albums
Paul Simon compilation albums